Mozi+ is a Hungarian TV channel dedicated exclusively to movies. It was launched on 3 January 2011 as PRO4. Contrary to most indigenous channels, PRO4 aired a wide array of series and movies, ranging from Hungarian and international classics to recent American films.

On 10 May 2016, Gábor Fischer announced at the Media Hungary 2016 conference that PRO4 would be repositioned as a movie channel, known as Mozi+. The rebranding took effect on 11 July 2016, at 06:00 CET, when it started airing promos with a countdown, and Mozi+ officially launched at 21:00 CET. The first movie aired on the channel was World War Z.

Series

Logos

References

External links
 Official website 

Television networks in Hungary
Television channels and stations established in 1997
1997 establishments in Hungary